Khangarh ,  is a town with a population of nearly 100,000. It is located in Muzaffargarh District, which is on the southern part of the province Punjab in Pakistan. It is situated on the west bank of the Chenab River. The city is known for being the hometown of the late Nawabzada Nasrullah Khan. It is also known for its agricultural produce of cotton and mango.

The city is situated on the banks of the Chenab River , 16 km from the Muzaffargarh road to Alipur . Nawab Shuja, the father of Nawab Muzaffar Khan founder Muzaffargarh, had given his daughter Khan Bibi. Khan Bibi was a soldier in the army of his brother Nawab Muzaffar Khan and was killed in the battle of Mankira. Its shrine is located outside Ghaus Bahawal Haqq's shrine in Multan. The same Khan Bibi was the founder of the town Khangarh. The fort is located on the eastern side of the river Chenab on the east side of the city and the fort is still present with its full walls and two gates and people are still living in it. In 1811, after the disputes between Nawab Muzaffar Khan and Nawab Bahawalpur escalated, Nawab Ahmed Khan annexed Khangarh and started rioting in the Bahawalpur area. Nawab Sadiq Mohammad Khan was fed up and sent a Lashkar-e-Khangarh under the command of the military officer Jacob. Yakub Khan besieged Khangarh, then Ahmed Khan escaped unharmed. 1818 ءI took control of the Sikhs at Khangarh. When the British government was formed in 1849, they made Khangarh the district headquarters and incorporated the suburbs of Khangarh, Sitapur and Rangpur. At that time, Rangpur also included Garh Maharaja and Ahmedpur fluid in Jhang district. It remained the district headquarters until 1850, after which Muzaffargarh was made a district and Khangarh Tehsil was added to it. Khangarh police station was established in 1849 while the Honorary Court was formed in 1893 and Nawabzada Saifullah Khan, father of the late politician Nawabzada Nasrullah Khan, was its judge.

Police stations, townhouses, town committees and dispensaries were also built in the English era. It is an important center of commerce in the area. Palm, mango and wheat are common. Mahla Duskiwala, Mohalla Shaikh Khan, Mohalla Syedan, Mohalla Tawheedabad, Mohalla Nawabhanwala, Nawi Basti, Basti Kalan and Rahmat Colony are the residential settlements while the main bazaar are trading centers. There are also warehouses in Pasco. There are shrines of Pir Mehdi Shah, Pir Balak Shah and Pir Talib Shah. The brewery here is very famous. Shams and waves are among the well-known poems in the town of Khangarh.

References

Populated places in Muzaffargarh District